is a railway station in Unazuki, Kurobe, Toyama, Japan, operated by the private railway operator Toyama Chihō Railway. It is the terminus of the line. It is also located close to Unazuki Station on the narrow-gauge Kurobe Gorge Railway.

Lines

Station layout
The station has one island platform with two tracks, ending with buffer stops. In former times, these tracks merged to enter a facility for loading and unloading narrow-gauge trucks with material for and from the construction of dams in the Kurobe River gorge.

Adjacent stations

History
The station opened on 21 November 1923, initially named . This was renamed  on 21 February 1924, eventually becoming Unazuki Onsen Station on 1 August 1971.

Passenger statistics
In fiscal 2015, the station was used by 1,058 passengers daily.

Surrounding area 
Unazuki Onsen

See also
 List of railway stations in Japan

References

External links

 

Railway stations in Toyama Prefecture
Railway stations in Japan opened in 1923
Stations of Toyama Chihō Railway
Kurobe, Toyama